is a Japanese professional footballer who plays as a forward for Roasso Kumamoto.

References

External links

1996 births
Living people
Japanese footballers
Association football forwards
FC Gifu players
Roasso Kumamoto players
J2 League players
J3 League players